Erich Grave (1891–1955) was a German art director.

Selected filmography
 Behind the Altar (1927)
 Don't Lose Heart, Suzanne! (1935)
 Maria the Maid (1936)
 The Call of the Jungle (1936)
 A Night in May (1938)
 The Fire Devil (1940)
 My Wife Theresa (1942)
 Bravo Acrobat! (1943)
 The Enchanted Day (1944)
 Paths in Twilight (1948)
 Gaspary's Sons (1948)
 I'll Never Forget That Night (1949)
 The Guilt of Doctor Homma (1951)
 The Uncle from America (1953)
 The Abduction of the Sabine Women (1954)
 Clivia (1954)

References

Bibliography 
 Giesen, Rolf.  Nazi Propaganda Films: A History and Filmography. McFarland, 2003.

External links 
 

1891 births
1955 deaths
Film people from Leipzig
German art directors